Arijon Ibrahimović (born 11 December 2005) is a German professional footballer who plays as a midfielder for Bundesliga club Bayern Munich.

Professional career
Ibrahimović is a youth product of Greuther Fürth and 1. FC Nürnberg, he moved to the youth academy of Bayern Munich in 2018. Impressing with his talent and skills he played for their U17 side at the age of 14, and U19 at the age of 16. He started training with the senior team in the preseason for the 2021–22 season. In September 2022, he was named by English newspaper The Guardian as one of the best players born in 2005 worldwide.

In 13 January 2023, Ibrahimović along with fellow Bayern Munich academy players Johannes Schenk, Tarek Buchmann, Yusuf Kabadayı and Lovro Zvonarek, made his debut with the senior team of Bayern Munich on a friendly match against Austrian club Red Bull Salzburg, coming as a substitute off the bench at the second half replacing Jamal Musiala, he scored the second goal for the team while being down 1–3, ultimately the match ended 4–4 in a draw. Days later in 17 January 2023, he signed a contract extension until 2025 with Bayern Munich, being fully promoted to the senior team.

On 11 February 2023, Ibrahimović made his Bundesliga debut in a 3–0 win over VfL Bochum, coming on as substitute for Leroy Sané in the 77th minute, in which he became the second youngest debutant for the club, only behind Paul Wanner.

International career
Ibrahimović is a youth international for Germany, having played for the Germany U16s, U17s, and U18s.

Playing style
Ibrahimović is a box to box midfielder who is just as adept at defending as attacking, a very technical player, who is also a strong presser and has intelligent positioning. He has earned comparisons in playstyle to Leon Goretzka.

Career statistics

Personal life
The Germany-born Ibrahimović's parents are Albanians from Prizren, Kosovo. Despite his surname, he is not related to the Swedish footballer Zlatan Ibrahimović.

References

External links
 Profile at the FC Bayern Munich website
 
 
 

2005 births
Living people
Footballers from Nuremberg
German footballers
Germany youth international footballers
German people of Kosovan descent
Association football midfielders
FC Bayern Munich footballers
Bundesliga players